Abel Jacquin (1893–1968) was a French actor who appeared in more than thirty films between 1930 and 1956. Jacquin co-directed the 1933 comedy film Les deux 'Monsieur' de Madame. He was also noted for his narration of the 1933 documentary Land Without Bread.

Selected filmography
 Anne-Marie (1936)
 Southern Mail (1937)
 Arsene Lupin, Detective (1937)
 White Cargo (1937)
 Princess Tarakanova (1938)
 Gibraltar (1938)
 Ultimatum (1938)
 The Bouquinquant Brothers (1947)
 Counter Investigation (1947)
 Man to Men (1948)
 Woman Without a Past (1948)
 At the Grand Balcony (1949)
 The Unfrocked One (1954)
 The Babes in the Secret Service (1956)

References

Bibliography
 Aitken, Ian (ed). The Concise Routledge Encyclopedia of the Documentary Film. Routledge, 2013.
 Jung, Uli & Schatzberg, Walter. Beyond Caligari: The Films of Robert Wiene. Berghahn Books, 1999.

External links

1893 births
1968 deaths
French male film actors
French film directors
People from Colombes
20th-century French male actors